Golden Oldies: Volume 1 - Computer Software Classics is a retrospective compilation of four games from prior to the microcomputer era: Adventure, Eliza, Life, and Pong. It was published in 1985 for the Apple II, Atari 8-bit family, Commodore 64, and DOS. Atari ST and Amiga versions followed in 1986. Despite the "Volume 1" in the title, no further collections were released.

Reception
Roy Wagner reviewed the game for Computer Gaming World, and stated that "These games are pure and simple, yet still fun to play and enjoy." Steve Panak, writing for ANALOG Computing, called the manual "superb," and concluded, "If you're interested in researching and reliving this portion of our recent history, Golden Oldies is a rich vein to tap."

References

External links
Review in Antic
Review in PC Magazine
Review in Compute!'s Gazette
Review in Info
Review in Atari Explorer

1985 video games
Amiga games
Apple II games
Atari 8-bit family games
Atari ST games
Commodore 64 games
DOS games
Video game compilations
Video games developed in the United States